The women's 80 metres hurdles at the 1962 British Empire and Commonwealth Games as part of the athletics programme was held at the Perry Lakes Stadium on Thursday 29 November and Saturday 1 December 1962.

13 runners competed in two heats in the first round, with the top three runners from each heat qualifying for the final.

The event was won by Australia's Pam Kilborn ahead of the joint world record holder Betty Moore from England and New Zealander Avis McIntosh who won bronze. Kilborn won the final in a slow time of 10.9 seconds running into a headwind of 7.0 m/s.

Records

Round 1

Heat 1

Heat 2

Final

References

Women's 80 metres hurdles
1962